Hocine Daikhi is an Algerian karateka. He is a two-time medalist, including gold, at the Mediterranean Games, a silver medalist at the African Games and a bronze medalist at the Islamic Solidarity Games. He has also won medals in individual and team events at several editions of the African Karate Championships.

He won the gold medal in the men's +84 kg event at the 2018 Mediterranean Games held in Tarragona, Spain. He also won the silver medal in the men's +84 kg event at the 2022 Mediterranean Games held in Oran, Algeria.

Career 

He won one of the bronze medals in his event at the 2016 World University Karate Championships held in Braga, Portugal. He also won one of the bronze medals in the men's team kumite event.

At the 2018 Mediterranean Games held in Tarragona, Spain, he won the gold medal in the men's +84 kg event. In that same year, he won the gold medal in his event at the 2018 African Karate Championships held in Kigali, Rwanda. He won one of the bronze medals in the men's team kumite event.

He won the silver medal in his event at the 2019 African Karate Championships held in Gaborone, Botswana. He also won the silver medal in the men's team kumite event. He represented Algeria at the 2019 African Games and he won the silver medal in the men's kumite +84 kg event. He also won the gold medal in the men's team kumite event. In 2020, he won the gold medal in his event and the men's team kumite event at the 2020 African Karate Championships held in Tangier, Morocco.

In June 2021, he competed at the World Olympic Qualification Tournament held in Paris, France hoping to qualify for the 2020 Summer Olympics in Tokyo, Japan. He was eliminated in his second match by Daniyar Yuldashev of Kazakhstan. In November 2021, he competed in the men's +84 kg event at the World Karate Championships held in Dubai, United Arab Emirates. He was eliminated in his second match. In December 2021, he won the gold medal in his event at the African Karate Championships held in Cairo, Egypt. He also won the silver medal in the men's team kumite event.

He won the silver medal in the men's +84 kg event at the 2022 Mediterranean Games held in Oran, Algeria. In the final, he lost against Anđelo Kvesić of Croatia. Two months later, he won one of the bronze medals in the men's kumite +84 kg event at the 2021 Islamic Solidarity Games held in Konya, Turkey. He defeated Majid Nikohemmat of Iran in his bronze medal match.

Achievements

References

External links 
 

Living people
Year of birth missing (living people)
Place of birth missing (living people)
Algerian male karateka
Competitors at the 2019 African Games
African Games medalists in karate
African Games gold medalists for Algeria
African Games silver medalists for Algeria
Competitors at the 2018 Mediterranean Games
Competitors at the 2022 Mediterranean Games
Mediterranean Games medalists in karate
Mediterranean Games gold medalists for Algeria
Mediterranean Games silver medalists for Algeria
Islamic Solidarity Games medalists in karate
Islamic Solidarity Games competitors for Algeria
21st-century Algerian people